Jan Kostka (ca. 1529–1581) was a Polish noble and a candidate in elections for the new King of Poland in 1572. He was also an advisor to Kings Henry of Valois and Stefan Batory.

He was a courtier and a secretary of the King, Podskarbi of Duchy of Prussia since 1555, castellan of Gdańsk in 1556–1574, voivode of Sandomierz Voivodeship since 1574, and president of the Komisja Morska (Sea Commission). He advocated for a union of Royal Prussia with the Crown.

In 1574 and 1575, he was proposed as candidate for King of Poland (see ).

Secular senators of the Polish–Lithuanian Commonwealth
1520s births
1581 deaths
Candidates for the Polish elective throne
Jan